Whitfield County may refer to:

Places
Whitfield County, Georgia

Ships
USS LST-1169, a United States Navy landing ship tank commissioned in 1954 and renamed USS Whitfield County (LST-1169) in 1955
USS Whitfield County (LST-1169), a United States Navy landing ship tank in commission from 1954 to 1973